A morong-gor is a public dining hall which is part of every Deori village. It is built in the western part of the degor or temple within the temple campus. It is a big hall without internal walls. It is open to of boys, girls, youth, men and women as well as senior citizens. Most public dinners, parties, meetings and discussions are held here.

Culture of Arunachal Pradesh